Mikhail Razhin (born 29 September 1984) is a Russian short track speed skater. He competed in three events at the 2006 Winter Olympics.

References

External links
 

1984 births
Living people
Russian male short track speed skaters
Olympic short track speed skaters of Russia
Short track speed skaters at the 2006 Winter Olympics
Speed skaters from Moscow